Neoschoenobia caustodes is a moth in the family Crambidae. It was described by Edward Meyrick in 1934. It is found in Australia, where it has been recorded from New South Wales.

References

Acentropinae
Moths described in 1934
Taxa named by Edward Meyrick